Dr. Gopalrao Bajirao Deshmukh alias Abasaheb Khedkar (14 January 1901 – 25 May 1969), also  known as Abasaheb Khedkar was a social activist and a farmer's leader in India. He was the Minister of Rural Development in the first cabinet ministry of Maharashtra and  the first President of Maharashtra Pradesh Congress Committee.

Biography
He was born at Khed in Amravati district of Vidarbha, Maharashtra on 14 January 1901.
In 1917, after his matriculation Abasaheb studied Homeopathy from Kolkata.
In 1920, when he  was studying at Amravati Victoria Technical School he came across Mahatma Gandhi non co-operation movement.
He established Shivaji Boarding in 1923 which later became Shivaji Education Society.

Political career

Abasaheb Khedkar was a protagonist of Samyukta Maharashtra and opposed to formation of separate Vidarbha. He wanted all Marathi speaking areas of India to be united under one state of Maharashtra, in the larger interest of Marathi people.
He was one of the signatories of the informal agreement reached in 1953 by Marathi speaking politicians from different regions of Marathi speaking areas on the composition, and organization of the future Maharashtra state. The agreement is popularly known as the  Nagpur Pact. He was the first president of Maharashtra Pradesh Congress Committee. He refused to take the position of Chief Minister of Maharashtra and preferred to take up the Rural Development portfolio. He was instrumental in implementing Panchayat raj in Maharashtra in the form of Zilla parishads (Equivalent to County or District Councils) in 1962.

Akola Loksabha
Khedkar was elected as Member of Parliament From Akola Lok Sabha constituency twice and served in the Lok sabha from 1951 to 1960. He resigned from the Lok sabha in 1960 to enter into government of the newly formed state of Maharashtra.

Akot Vidhansabha
Khedkar was elected from Akot constituency in 1962 to the first legislative assembly of the newly formed state of  Maharashtra.
He was re-elected from the same  constituency in the 1967 elections.

Death and legacy

 Dr. Abasaheb Khedkar died in 1969 at Amravati.
 Shri Shivaji Arts and Commerce Mahavidyalaya at Telhara district Akola was renamed in his memory to Dr Gopalrao Khedkar Mahavidyalaya Gadegaon (Telhara).
 A Special cover of the Indian Postal Stamp was issued by the then President Of India, Mrs Pratibha Patil in  2013 at Amravati. Early in Mrs. Patil's career, Abasaheb had been her political mentor. His son was Late Vasantrao Gopalrao Khedkar Retd. IAS and daughter Late Nalini Vasant Deshmukh.

References

External links
 About Amravati District
 Shri Shivaji Education Society, Amravati
 First MPCC President

1969 deaths
1900s births
People from Amravati district
Nehru administration
India MPs 1952–1957
India MPs 1957–1962
Maharashtra MLAs 1962–1967
Maharashtra MLAs 1967–1972
Indian homeopaths
Lok Sabha members from Maharashtra
Marathi politicians
Indian National Congress politicians from Maharashtra